Miralda senex is a species of sea snail, a marine gastropod mollusk in the family Pyramidellidae, the pyrams and their allies.

Distribution
This marine species occurs off Queensland, Australia.

References

 Laseron, C. F. (1959). Family Pyramidellidae (Mollusca) from Northern Australia. Australian Journal of Marine and Freshwater Research. 10 (2): 177-267
 Peñas A. & Rolán E. (2017). Deep water Pyramidelloidea from the central and South Pacific. The tribe Chrysallidini. ECIMAT (Estación de Ciencias Mariñas de Toralla), Universidade de Vigo. 412 pp.

External links
 To World Register of Marine Species
 Hedley, C. (1902). Studies on Australian Mollusca. Part VI. Proceedings of the Linnean Society of New South Wales. 27: 7-29, pl. 1-3

Pyramidellidae
Gastropods described in 1902